Case del Conte, sometimes also spelled Casa del Conte, is a southern Italian village and hamlet (frazione) of Montecorice, a municipality in the province of Salerno, Campania. As of 2009 its population was of 235.

History
The toponym means "Count's houses" in Italian, and refers to village's origins, linked to the Counts Matarazzo, owners of the original lodge and the surrounding rural area.

Geography
Case del Conte is located in northern Cilento, at the municipal borders of Castellabate, separated from its hamlet Ogliastro Marina (2 km far) by the Rio dell'Arena river. It extends along the national highway SS 267, from the zone Pietà to Arena, in which is located the beach.

The village is part of the Cilentan Coast, by the Tyrrhenian Sea, and is 4 km far from San Marco and Montecorice, 7 from Santa Maria and Agnone, 8 from Castellabate, 11 from Acciaroli and 18 from Agropoli. It counts two hill localities, named Mainolfi (or Mainolfo) and Giungatelle, on the provincial road linking it to Perdifumo (9 km far).

See also
Cilentan dialect
Cilento and Vallo di Diano National Park

References

External links

Frazioni of the Province of Salerno
Localities of Cilento
Coastal towns in Campania